Gilberto Nobili is an Italian sailor who has sailed in multiple America's Cups.

Born in Castelnovo ne' Monti, Nobili sailed with Prada Challenge in the 2003 Louis Vuitton Cup. He competed with Francesco Bruni in the 2006 Star World Championships before sailing with Luna Rossa Challenge in the 2007 Louis Vuitton Cup.

He joined Oracle Racing in 2008, and sailed on Oracle Team USA 17 in the 2013 America's Cup. He originally re-joined Luna Rossa for the 2017 America's Cup campaign, but Luna Rossa withdrew from the competition, and Nobili joined Team New Zealand.

References

Sportspeople from Reggio Emilia
Living people
Italian male sailors (sport)
Luna Rossa Challenge sailors
Oracle Racing sailors
Team New Zealand sailors
2003 America's Cup sailors
2007 America's Cup sailors
2013 America's Cup sailors
Extreme Sailing Series sailors
Year of birth missing (living people)
2021 America's Cup sailors